Cordylancistrus perijae is a species of catfish in the family Loricariidae. It is native to South America, where it occurs in the basins of the Palmar River and the Socuy River in the Lake Maracaibo drainage in Venezuela. It is found in humid, tropical, mountainous rivers with transparent waters, moderate to strong currents, riverbeds composed of stones and sand, and little, if any, aquatic vegetation. The species is named for the Serranía del Perijá, a mountain range with foothills containing the type locality where it was first collected. It reaches 12.7 cm (5 inches) SL.

References 

Ancistrini
Fish described in 1996